Lipec may refer to:
 Lipec (Kolín District), Czech Republic
 Lipec, Vinica, North Macedonia